Car longevity is of interest to many car owners and includes several things: maximum service life in either mileage or time (duration), relationship of components to this lifespan, identification of factors that might afford control in extending the lifespan. Barring an accidental end to the lifespan, a car would have a life constrained by the earliest part to fail. Some have argued that rust and other factors related to the body of a car are the prime limits to extended longevity.

Background

An automobile is a highly engineered collection of complex components, each of which has its own lifespan and longevity characteristics. The MTBF (mean time between failures) of some components is expected to be smaller than the life of the car, as the replacement of these is considered part of regular maintenance. Other components, which typically experience less wear, are expected to have a longer life; however, a large longevity may very well require replacement of several of these, raising issues of economics. 

The motivation for pursuing longevity can vary. The economic trade-off of the remaining value versus repair cost is usually considered when deciding to repair or discard. Other factors, such as emotional attachment or a desire to reduce waste, may also be involved.

The life of the auto, as the collection, follows, according to a very common model, a bathtub-like pattern. After an initial phase, where failure because of design and manufacturing defects as opposed to wear-out, is more likely (hence the offering of the warranties by the manufacturer), there may be a long period of unlikely failure. The maximum lifespan and future value as a classic for any car are typically not known when the car is purchased. Research into longevity of vehicles will improve the ability to predict car life, with such things as a life table for cars.

Statistics

Factors related to longevity of vehicle
Bob Sikorsky and various institutions have developed lists that itemize steps that a car owner can take, or identified operating and maintenance rules, to ensure maximal longevity.

1. Regular oil changes
2. Monitor the key fluids
3. Maintain the transmission
4. Change the spark plugs as needed
5. Replace the timing belt as recommended (if applicable)
6. Replace air filter as required
7. Know and use your maintenance manual
8. No sudden starts and stops
9. Plentiful low cost replacement parts being available

In a public economics sense, Thomas Kasmer argues that retrofitting autos with a newer transmission would extend the lifespan while at the same time increase fuel efficiency, reduce carbon emissions, and prevent the sudden influx of discarded vehicles into the waste bin as cars are junked to be replaced by a modern vehicle.  However, with replacement parts for modern cars becoming ever more high tech, expensive and proprietary and therefore difficult to obtain (due to OEM copyright), many critical components are no longer available at low cost from third party aftermarket suppliers.  Due to this fact, most modern cars can no longer be maintained once repair cost of the car exceed resale value.  This trend has led to the modern cars being labeled as the first ever "disposable" cars.

Notable examples of high mileage
Some car manufacturers support a "high mileage" club.

Many non-commercial vehicles (both auto and truck) have exceeded . For instance, in 2013, East Patchogue, New York resident Irv Gordon (1940-2018) had accumulated  in his 1966 Volvo P1800. The car had amassed  by Gordon's death on 15 November 2018.

In 2006, a 1995 Dodge Ram was reported to Chrysler as having gone .

A 1976 Mercedes-Benz 240D in Greece belonging to Gregorios Sachinidis had reached  before retiring to the Mercedes-Benz Museum in Germany.

A 1989 Saab 900 SPG belonging to Peter Gilbert of Wisconsin had put in  before it was donated to the Wisconsin Automotive Museum.

Another was the 1963 Volkswagen Beetle belonging to Albert Klein of Pasadena, California that had accumulated  on 25 January 1993.

References

See also
Reliability engineering
Economics of automobile ownership
Scrappage program
Sustainable transport
Vehicular metrics

Longevity
Transport economics
Conservation and restoration of vehicles